Bryan Michael Mauricette (born 4 September 1946) was a cricketer: a right-handed wicketkeeper-batsman who played a handful of first-class matches (and one List A game) for the Windward Islands between 1966–67 and 1972–73 without ever passing 20.

He later played for Canada in both the 1979 ICC Trophy and the same year's World Cup. His new country lost all three of their World Cup matches by large margins, with Mauricette making just 20 runs in his three ODI innings. His ICC Trophy performances were also mostly poor, although he did make 72 in the semi-final victory against Bermuda.

Mauricette later became involved in coaching, and coached Canada at the 2004 ICC Six Nations Challenge.

References

External links
 

Canadian cricketers
Canada One Day International cricketers
Canadian cricket captains
Cricketers at the 1979 Cricket World Cup
Windward Islands cricketers
1946 births
Living people
Saint Lucian emigrants to Canada
Saint Lucian cricketers
Canadian cricket coaches
Coaches of the Canada national cricket team
Wicket-keepers